Armand-Emile-Jean-Baptiste Kohl, (born 1845  Paris), was a French illustrator and prolific engraver, a student of Alexandre Falguière and Laplaute, and who exhibited at the Paris Salon from 1869.

His engravings were after the work of artists such as T. Taylor (fl. 1890), Achille Sirouy, Frédéric Théodore Lix (1830-1897), Wanckler, James MacLaren Barclay and Henri Zuber.

Books illustrated

Voyages dans l´Amerique du Sud, París, 1883
The Garden magazine, William Robinson
The English Flower Garden, William Robinson, 1883
The Garden that I Love, Alfred Austin, (Macmillan and Co. 1894)
La Nouvelle Géographie universelle, la terre et les hommes, Élisée Reclus, 1875

References

1845 births
French engravers
19th-century engravers
Year of death missing